The 2020 Supercopa Peruana was the 1st edition of the Supercopa Peruana, an annual football super cup contested by the winners of the previous season's Liga 1 and Copa Bicentenario competitions.

The match was played between the 2019 Copa Bicentenario champion, Atlético Grau, and the winners of the 2019 Liga 1, Binacional.

Qualified teams

Match details

References

External links 
Peruvian Football League News 

Football competitions in Peru
2020 in Peruvian football